The Atlanta Hawks are an American professional basketball team based in Atlanta. The Hawks compete in the National Basketball Association (NBA) as a member of the league's Eastern Conference Southeast Division. The team plays its home games at State Farm Arena.

The team's origins can be traced to the establishment of the Buffalo Bisons in 1946 in Buffalo, New York, a member of the National Basketball League (NBL) owned by Ben Kerner and Leo Ferris. After 38 days in Buffalo, the team moved to Moline, Illinois, where they were renamed the Tri-Cities Blackhawks. In 1949, they joined the NBA as part of the merger between the NBL and the Basketball Association of America (BAA), and briefly had Red Auerbach as coach. In 1951, Kerner moved the team to Milwaukee, where they changed their name to the Milwaukee Hawks. Kerner and the team moved again in 1955 to St. Louis, where they won their only NBA Championship in 1958 and qualified to play in the NBA Finals in 1957, 1960 and 1961. The Hawks played the Boston Celtics in all four of their trips to the NBA Finals. The St. Louis Hawks moved to Atlanta in 1968, when Kerner sold the franchise to Thomas Cousins and former Georgia Governor Carl Sanders.

The Hawks currently own the second-longest drought (behind the Sacramento Kings) of not winning an NBA championship at 63 seasons. The franchise's lone NBA championship, as well as all four NBA Finals appearances, occurred when the team was based in St. Louis. Meanwhile, they went 48 years without advancing past the second round of the playoffs in any format, until finally breaking through in 2015. However, the Hawks are one of only four NBA teams that have qualified to play in the NBA playoffs in 10 consecutive seasons in the 21st century. They achieved this feat between 2008 and 2017.

Franchise history

1946–1953: Buffalo, Tri-Cities and Milwaukee

The origins of the Atlanta Hawks can be traced back to the Buffalo Bisons franchise, which was founded in 1946. The Bisons were a member of the National Basketball League, and played their games at the Buffalo Memorial Auditorium. The club was organized by Leo Ferris and the Erie County American Legion and was coached by Nat Hickey. Their first game – a 50–39 victory over the Syracuse Nationals – was played on November 8, 1946. On the team was William "Pop" Gates, who, along with William "Dolly" King, was one of the first two African-American players in the NBL. The team, which needed to draw 3,600 fans per game to break even, struggled to draw 1,000 fans per game to the Auditorium. The franchise lasted only 38 days (13 games) in Buffalo when, on December 25, 1946, Leo Ferris, the team's general manager and co-owner, announced that the team would be moving to Moline, Illinois, which at that time was part of an area then known as the "Tri-Cities": Moline, Illinois, Rock Island, Illinois, and Davenport, Iowa.

Upon relocation to Moline, the team was renamed the Tri-Cities Blackhawks, and played their home games at Wharton Field House, a 6,000-seat arena in Moline. The team featured guard/forward and coach Deanglo King, and was owned by Leo Ferris and Ben Kerner. Pop Gates remained on the Blackhawks roster, and finished second on the team in scoring behind future 1949 NBL MVP Don Otten. A Naismith Basketball Hall of Fame member, Gates helped to integrate the league and later became the first African-American coach in a major sports league, coaching Dayton in 1948.

In 1949, the Blackhawks became one of the National Basketball Association's 17 original teams after a merger of the 12-year-old NBL and the three-year-old Basketball Association of America (BAA). They reached the playoffs in the NBA's inaugural year under the leadership of coach Red Auerbach. The following season, they drafted three-time All-American Bob Cousy, but they were unable to reach a deal and traded him to the Chicago Stags (who would later surrender him in a dispersal draft to the Boston Celtics when the Stags folded). The Blackhawks finished last in the Western Division and missed the playoffs. By then, it was obvious that the Tri-Cities area was too small to support an NBA team. After the season, the franchise relocated to Milwaukee, Wisconsin, and became the Milwaukee Hawks.

1954–1965: St. Louis and The Bob Pettit era

In 1954, the Hawks drafted Bob Pettit, a future NBA MVP. Despite this, the Hawks were one of the league's worst teams, and in 1955 the Hawks moved, this time to St. Louis, Missouri, Milwaukee's rival in the beer industry, and became the St. Louis Hawks.

In 1956, Bob Pettit captured the league's first official Most Valuable Player award, and the St. Louis Hawks drafted legendary Bill Russell in the first round (second overall pick). They immediately traded Russell to the Boston Celtics for Cliff Hagan and Ed Macauley, both Hall of Fame members.

In 1957, the Hawks finished four games under .500. However, the Western Division was extremely weak that year; no team in the division had a winning record. They won the division title and a bye to the division finals after defeating the Minneapolis Lakers and Fort Wayne Pistons in one-game tiebreakers. They then defeated the Lakers in the division finals to advance to the Finals, losing to the Boston Celtics in a double-overtime thriller in game seven. In 1958, after tallying their first winning record, they again advanced to the Finals, where they avenged their defeat against the Celtics from the previous year, winning the series 4–2 and giving the Hawks their first and only NBA Championship. Bob Pettit scored 50 points in the final game of the series.  The following season Bob Pettit led the Hawks to a Western Division-best 49–23 record, helping him capture his second MVP award.

The Hawks remained one of the NBA's premier teams for the next decade. In 1960, under coach Ed Macauley, the team advanced to the Finals, but lost to the Celtics in another game seven thriller. The following year, with the acquisition of rookie Lenny Wilkens, the Hawks repeated their success, but met the Celtics in the 1961 NBA Finals again and lost in five games. They would remain contenders for most of the 1960s, advancing deep into the playoffs and also capturing several division titles.

1965–1975: Relocation to Atlanta
Despite the success, Kerner became weary of the Hawks' longtime home, Kiel Auditorium. The 33-year-old arena seated only 10,000 and was starting to show its age. The Hawks occasionally played at the larger St. Louis Arena, mostly against popular opponents, but Kerner was not willing to move the team there full-time because it had not been well-maintained since the 1940s. Even though it was being heavily renovated to accommodate the arrival of the NHL's Blues in 1967, Kerner was still not willing to move to the St. Louis Arena. He wanted a new arena to increase revenue. However, Kerner was rebuffed by the city on several occasions. In early 1967, Kerner briefly put the Hawks up for sale. One of the bidders was a New Orleans group led by future talk show host Morton Downey Jr., but the deal collapsed and Kerner temporarily took his team off the market.

Unable to resolve the arena situation, Kerner sold the Hawks to Atlanta real estate developer Tom Cousins and former Georgia governor Carl Sanders, who moved the team to Atlanta in 1968. While a new arena was being constructed, the team spent its first four seasons playing at Alexander Memorial Coliseum on the campus of Georgia Tech, winning their first Division title in the 1969–70 season with a  record in the Western Division. Cousins' firm soon developed the Omni Coliseum, a 16,500-seat, state-of-the-art downtown Atlanta arena, for the Hawks and the expansion Atlanta Flames ice hockey franchise, which opened in 1972 as the first phase of a massive sports, office, hotel, and retail complex, most of which is now the CNN Center. Also in 1972, the Hawks debuted a new logo and new colors, trading the green and blue color scheme that the team had used for two years, in favor of white, gold, and red, the same colors the Flames used. The hawk head silhouette inside a circle remained as the team's logo, albeit simplified.

The years after the move showcased a talented Hawks team, including Pete Maravich and Lou Hudson. However, after this period of success, the team experienced some years of rebuilding. Despite appearing to be moving in the right direction when they ended up with the first and third picks overall in the 1975 NBA draft, the players drafted with those two picks, David Thompson of North Carolina State and Marvin Webster of Morgan State, both signed with the Denver Nuggets of the American Basketball Association (ABA) and never played for the Hawks.

Ted Turner's ownership
Cable network entrepreneur and Atlanta Braves owner Ted Turner bought the team in 1977 and hired Hubie Brown to become head coach. The Hawks were the only NBA team in the Deep South, just as the Atlanta Braves were the only Major League Baseball team in the region for many years to come. Turner's ownership was instrumental in keeping both teams in the region. Coach Brown won coach of the year in 1978. In the 1979–80 season, the Hawks finished with a 50–32 record and won the Central Division. It was their first division title in the Central Division and second in the city of Atlanta. The next season, the Hawks got off to a 4–0 start, then lost 13 of the next 14 games and with 3 games left in the season, the Hawks fired head coach Hubie Brown en route to the team's 31–51 record.

1982–1994: The Dominique Wilkins era

In 1982, the franchise acquired superstar Dominique Wilkins (a University of Georgia alumni) and promoted Mike Fratello to head coach a year later. Due to sagging attendance, 12 home games during the 1984–85 season were played at the Lakefront Arena in New Orleans, Louisiana. The New Orleans games were paid for by Barry Mendelson for $1.2 million with the Hawks going 6–6 in Louisiana. Dominique Wilkins won the Slam Dunk Contest in 1985 and 1990, engaging in an iconic rivalry with Michael Jordan. Spud Webb won the Slam Dunk Contest and Fratello won the Coach of the Year Award in 1986.

From 1985 to 1989, the Hawks were among the league's elite, winning 50 games or more each season. They won a division title in 1986–87 going 57–25 which was a franchise record that would last until the 2014–15 season. However, the team could not advance past the semifinals of the Eastern Conference playoffs, losing to the eventual Eastern Conference (and in some years, NBA) champions Boston and Detroit. The Hawks drafted Stacey Augmon with their ninth overall pick in the 1991 NBA draft, who would make the All-Rookie First Team. However, Wilkins had a season-ending injury in the middle of the season, and without him, the Hawks were unable to make it to the playoffs. In 1992, the Hawks acquired guard Mookie Blaylock from the New Jersey Nets; he would spend seven years of his career as a Hawk, leading them in career steals and three-point field goals while earning an All-Star appearance in 1994. After seasons of mediocrity, Lenny Wilkens was hired as head coach in 1993. In 1993–94, the Hawks won 57 games, tying a team record. They also won a fourth division title in Atlanta, and third in the Central Division. Coach Wilkens was named Coach of the Year for his work with the team. However, the team fell short again in the playoffs, losing to the fifth-seeded Indiana Pacers in the Eastern semis in six games. The season was also marred by the trading of Dominique Wilkins, who remains the franchise all-time leading scorer, to the Los Angeles Clippers for Danny Manning, who quickly left via free agency to the Phoenix Suns after the season ended. On March 6, 2015, Dominique Wilkins received a statue in front of Philips Arena.

1994–2005: Fluctuating times

At the beginning of the 1994–95 season, the Hawks traded forward Kevin Willis to the Miami Heat for Steve Smith and Grant Long. During the season, coach Wilkens broke the record (previously held by coach Red Auerbach) for most victories by an NBA head coach with victory number 939. They ended up fifth in the Central Division with a 42–40 record, they would be swept by the Indiana Pacers in the first round of the playoffs. The Hawks finished the 1995–96 season with a 46–36 record, fourth in the Central Division. Midway through the season, they acquired Christian Laettner from the Minnesota Timberwolves; Laettner would get an All-Star appearance in 1997. They upset the third-seeded Pacers in the first round in five games, however lost in five games to the Orlando Magic in the semifinals.

Around this time, it was decided that the Omni should be replaced by a new arena. The Omni was designed with weathering steel that was intended to rust into a seal around the arena so it could last for decades. However, the designers and architects did not reckon on Atlanta's humid subtropical climate. As a result, it never stopped rusting, and looked somewhat dated despite being 25 years old. When Turner won an NHL franchise, the Atlanta Thrashers, one condition was that a new arena had to be in place before the new team took the ice for the first time, as The Omni was unusable even for temporary use. Eventually, it was decided that The Omni would be demolished and a new arena for the Hawks and the expansion NHL Thrashers would be built on the same area. Following the 1997 playoffs, the Hawks moved back to Georgia Tech's Alexander Memorial Coliseum, with the Georgia Dome used for larger-capacity games, until Philips Arena opened before the 1999–2000 season.

The Hawks had two 50+ win seasons in 1996–97 (56–26) and 1997–98 (50–32), with center Dikembe Mutombo winning defensive player of the year awards back to back. The Hawks defeated the Detroit Pistons in five games in the first round of the 1997 NBA playoffs, but lost in five games in the second round to the defending champs Chicago Bulls. Game 4, an 89–80 loss, would be the last game at The Omni. In 1997–98, forward Alan Henderson won Most Improved Player award. However, the Hawks would lose in four games in the first round of the playoffs to the Charlotte Hornets. The Hawks would end up with a 31-win campaign in the lockout-shortened 1998–99 season. In the first round they defeated the Pistons in five games again, but they could not advance past the second round of the playoffs, as they were swept by the eighth-seeded New York Knicks.

In the 1999–2000 season, their first season at Philips Arena, the Hawks traded Steve Smith to Portland for Isaiah Rider and Jim Jackson, and sent Mookie Blaylock and a first-round draft pick to the Golden State Warriors for Bimbo Coles and a first-round draft pick. Smith and Blaylock had been two of the Hawks' most popular players during the 1990s, and Smith had recently been awarded the J. Walter Kennedy Citizenship Award for his charitable endeavors, as well as being selected in the 1998 NBA All-Star Game. By contrast, Rider had a history of behavioral problems both on and off the court. Rider's troubled conduct continued after his arrival in Atlanta. Rider missed the first day of training camp and was late for two games. After reports that he smoked marijuana in an Orlando hotel room during a January road trip, the league demanded that he attend drug counseling, and fined him a total of $200,000 until he agreed to go. When he showed up late for a March game, the Hawks released him. The Smith/Rider trade sent the Hawks into a downward spiral. After only missing the playoffs four times since 1977, they fell to seventh place in the Central Division with a 28–54 record; they would not return to the playoffs for eight years.

Point guard Jason Terry became the team's scoring leader during the 2000–01 season, leading them with 19.7 ppg. After the All-Star break, the Hawks traded Mutombo to the Philadelphia 76ers for Theo Ratliff, Toni Kukoč, and Nazr Mohammed. However, Ratliff was injured and did not play with the Hawks until next season. They ended the season with a 25–57 record. In 2001, the Hawks drafted Spanish star Pau Gasol 3rd, but his rights were ceded to the Memphis Grizzlies in a trade involving Shareef Abdur-Rahim. Abdur-Rahim became the team's scoring leader, and made his only All-Star appearance in 2002. The team ended up 33–49 for the 2001–02 season. The Hawks sent Kukoc to the Milwaukee Bucks for All-Star Glenn Robinson in 2002, Robinson lead the team with 20.8 ppg. But the Hawks still failed to make the playoffs for the 2002–03 season, finishing with a 35–47 record.

In February 2004, the Hawks had the distinction of having NBA All-Star Rasheed Wallace play one game for the team. Wallace was traded from Portland to the Hawks along with Wesley Person for Abdur-Rahim, Ratliff, and Dan Dickau. In his lone game for the Hawks, Wallace scored 20 points, had 6 rebounds, 5 blocks, 2 assists and a steal in a loss to the New Jersey Nets. After the game he was dealt to the Detroit Pistons in a three-way trade with the Boston Celtics. In turn, Detroit sent guard Bob Sura, center Željko Rebrača, and a first-round draft pick to the Hawks. The Boston Celtics also sent forward Chris Mills to Atlanta to complete the deal, but Mills never had a chance to play in a Hawks uniform. The Hawks ended their 2003–04 season with a 28–54 record. In 2003, Atlanta hosted the All-Star game, the last an Eastern Conference team would host for nine years.

Atlanta Spirit LLC's ownership
On March 31, 2004, the team was sold to a group of executives by the name of Atlanta Spirit LLC by Time Warner (who inherited the Hawks, Braves and Thrashers upon its merger with Turner Broadcasting in 1996). During the off-season, the Hawks sent Jason Terry, Alan Henderson, and a future first-round draft pick to the Dallas Mavericks for Antoine Walker and Tony Delk. After the change in ownership, the Hawks still struggled. In the 2004–05 season, the Hawks were the league's worst team with a mere 13 victories (five fewer than even the expansion Charlotte Bobcats and the struggling New Orleans Hornets). It was also the year Josh Smith won the 2005 Slam Dunk Contest.

2005–2012: Joe Johnson era

In the summer of 2005, the Hawks completed a sign and trade deal with the Phoenix Suns to acquire Joe Johnson in return for Boris Diaw and two future 1st round picks. They also signed Zaza Pachulia from the Milwaukee Bucks. These changes occurred after an apparent power struggle between the owners for nearly three weeks before the moves were made.

Despite their league-worst record the previous season, the Hawks only landed the number two pick in the 2005 NBA draft lottery (the first pick went to the Milwaukee Bucks). With the second pick, the Hawks selected Marvin Williams of North Carolina. In the 2006 draft, the Hawks selected former Duke star Shelden Williams with the fifth overall pick.

Hope and redemption appeared to be on the horizon for the Hawks beginning in 2007. With the third pick of the NBA draft, they selected Al Horford. Horford nearly averaged a double-double during his rookie season, and was the only unanimous selection to the All-Rookie First Team as well as being runner-up for Rookie of the Year honors. The season started with a victory against the Dallas Mavericks 101–94, sending hope to Hawks fans. The last time they won a season opener was in 1998, also the last time they made the playoffs. For the 2007–08 season, the Atlanta Hawks updated the logos and uniforms that saw navy blue become the primary color, with red relegated to trim color status. This marked the first time in team history that they had used navy blue as one of their colors.

A mid-season trade for point guard Mike Bibby boosted the Hawks' playoff hopes. At the time of the trade the Hawks were 22–28; afterwards, they won 15 of their last 32 games to finish 37–45. Although they finished with a losing record, they managed to make the playoffs for the first time since 1999. In the playoffs the Hawks started to show improvement, pushing the eventual NBA Champions, Boston Celtics, to a Game 7 before losing in a blowout in Boston. The Hawks won all three games at Philips Arena, which hosted its first playoff games and earned its first sellout.

The 2008–09 season saw the Hawks win 47 games, their first winning season since 1999. With almost an intact lineup from the previous year, the Hawks manage to take a step forward in their development. Again they were pushed to a Game 7 in the first round but capitalized on home-court advantage earning their first playoff series win since 1999 against the Miami Heat. The Hawks were swept by the Cleveland Cavaliers 4–0 in the Conference Semifinals.

The 2009–10 season saw the Hawks improve further, winning 53 games, their first 50-win season since 1997–98. Al Horford earned his first All-Star selection, and along with Joe Johnson, this marked the first time since 1998 that the Hawks sent two players to the All-Star Game. The playoffs, however, were a reprise from the previous year. They won a hard-fought seven-game series against the Milwaukee Bucks, but they were swept by the Orlando Magic in the second round, with every game a one-sided contest. After the season, the Hawks dismissed head coach Mike Woodson and was replaced by Larry Drew.

The Hawks took a step back in the 2010–11 season, finishing with 44 wins, even though Horford and Johnson were named to the All-Star team. In mid-season the Hawks traded Mike Bibby to the Washington Wizards for Kirk Hinrich, in hopes of bringing a defensive guard to replace the defensively liable Bibby. The Hawks finished the season losing their final six games. In the playoffs the Hawks beat the Magic in six games; however, they subsequently lost to the Chicago Bulls in the Eastern Conference Semifinals in six games.

In August 2011, it was announced that California-based businessman Alex Meruelo was buying a majority stake of the Hawks, but in November he backed out of his intentions.

In December 2011, the Hawks signed Tracy McGrady, Jerry Stackhouse, Jason Collins, Vladimir Radmanovic, Jannero Pargo, and Willie Green. They also picked up rookies Donald Sloan and 27-year-old Ivan Johnson. Sloan was waived a month later.

The Hawks finished the 2011–12 season with the fourth-best record in the Eastern Conference with 40 wins, clinching the playoffs for the fifth straight season. However, the Hawks would be eliminated in the first round by the Boston Celtics in six games, ending the Hawks' three-year streak of advancing to the second round.

2012–2013: Roster turnover
On June 25, 2012, the Hawks hired San Antonio Spurs Vice President of Basketball Operations Danny Ferry as President of Basketball Operations and General Manager. During the 2012 NBA draft, the Hawks chose guard John Jenkins with the 23rd pick and power forward Mike Scott with the 43rd pick. On July 2, 2012, the Hawks traded leading scorer and All-Star Joe Johnson to the Brooklyn Nets for Jordan Farmar, Anthony Morrow, DeShawn Stevenson, Jordan Williams and Johan Petro, as well as a 2013 first-round pick. That same day, the Hawks traded small forward Marvin Williams to the Utah Jazz for point guard Devin Harris.

On July 10, 2012, the Hawks signed guard Lou Williams.

On January 21, 2013, following Lou Williams' season-ending injury in a game against the Brooklyn Nets, the Hawks signed guard Jannero Pargo to a 10-day contract.

On February 21, 2013, the Hawks traded Morrow to the Dallas Mavericks for Dahntay Jones. That same day, the Hawks traded a future 2nd-round pick to the Golden State Warriors in exchange for Jeremy Tyler, who was waived 15 days later.

The Hawks ended the 2012–13 season with a 44–38 record, making a playoff appearance for the sixth straight season. However, they were eliminated by the Indiana Pacers in six games in the first round. By the end of the off-season, every player involved in the Johnson and Williams trades just a year earlier were either waived or not brought back. The 2013 free agency period also marked the end of the Josh Smith era for Atlanta as he signed a contract with the Detroit Pistons. Longtime Hawk Zaza Pachulia moved on as well and signed with the Milwaukee Bucks. With half the roster gone, 2012–13 proved to be a roster turnover year, paving a path to success for Mike Budenholzer.

2013–2018: Mike Budenholzer era
On May 28, 2013, the Hawks hired San Antonio Spurs assistant coach Mike Budenholzer as the new head coach.

The Hawks entered the 2013 NBA draft with four draft picks. They drafted point guards Dennis Schröder (17th pick) and Shane Larkin (18th pick). They also chose point guard Raulzinho Neto with the 47th pick and small forward James Ennis with the 50th pick. However, the Hawks traded Larkin to the Dallas Mavericks for the draft rights of Mike Muscala and Lucas Nogueira (originally drafted by the Boston Celtics), as well as guard Jared Cunningham. They also traded Ennis's draft rights to the Miami Heat and Neto's to the Utah Jazz for a future second-round pick. The Hawks brought back Kyle Korver with a four-year, $24 million deal and signed power forward Paul Millsap to a two-year, $19 million deal.

On December 26, 2013, Horford tore his right pectoral muscle, and on December 30, the Hawks announced that he would undergo surgery the next day and would miss the rest of the season. The Hawks finished 38–44, their first losing season since 2008. However, due to the weakness of the Eastern Conference, they finished as the 8th seed in the playoffs, and just like 2008, the Hawks would not go down easy, as they took the top-seeded Pacers to 7 games in before a 92–80 loss in Game 7.

On May 1, 2014, the Hawks unveiled a new secondary logo, which is a modernized version of the 1972–95 "Pac-Man" logo. On July 15, 2014, they acquired defensive specialist Thabo Sefolosha from the Oklahoma City Thunder. On September 7, 2014, Bruce Levenson announced he would sell his share of the team, after self-reporting an inappropriate email he sent in 2012. Some in the African American sports community have defended Levenson, namely Jason Whitlock and Kareem Abdul-Jabbar, commenting that Levenson's email had no racist intent, but was motivated by valid business concerns.

On January 2, 2015, The Atlanta Journal-Constitution reported that the remaining minority owners of Atlanta Hawks, LLC would join Levenson, effectively putting the entire franchise for sale. The sale of the team as well as the operating rights to Philips Arena was handled by Goldman Sachs and Inner Circle Sports LLC. The NBA has stated that the Hawks would remain in Atlanta as a condition of their sale. Additionally, Atlanta mayor Kasim Reed stated that the city might offer incentives for a prospective owner to keep the Hawks in Atlanta for another 30 years. On April 22, 2015, Atlanta Spirit reached a tentative agreement to sell the franchise to a group led by billionaire Tony Ressler (with Grant Hill, Steven Price, Rick Schnall, Sara Blakely, Jesse Itzler and Ressler's wife Jami Gertz holding minority stakes) for $850 million; the sale was approved by the NBA Board of Governors on June 24, 2015.

On January 31, 2015, the Hawks became the first NBA team to go 17–0 in a calendar month by beating Portland. The 2015 All-Star Game consisted of four Hawks All-Stars including Jeff Teague, Paul Millsap, Kyle Korver and Al Horford. On March 9, 2015, Kyle Korver and DeMarre Carroll each scored 20 points to help the Hawks become the first NBA team to 50 wins in 2014–15, scoring a season-high in routing the Sacramento Kings 130–105. The Hawks also set a franchise record by going 20-of-36 for three-pointers, breaking the mark of 19 set against the Dallas Mavericks on December 17, 1996. On March 20, 2015, the Hawks clinched their first division title in over two decades and became the first team not based in Florida to win the NBA's Southeast Division; one week later, with a win over Miami as well as a Cleveland loss to Brooklyn, the Hawks clinched the top seed in the Eastern Conference playoffs. The team finished a franchise-best 60–22.

In the Eastern Conference first round, the Hawks defeated the Brooklyn Nets in six games. The Hawks then advanced to the Eastern Conference Semifinals to face the Washington Wizards, also defeating them in six games. It was the first time they had advanced past the second round since 1967, their next-to-last year in St. Louis. The Hawks advanced to the Eastern Conference Finals for the first time in franchise history, when they lost in four games to the Cleveland Cavaliers.

On June 22, 2016, the Hawks traded Jeff Teague to Indiana in a three-team deal, that would give Utah's 12th pick in the 2016 NBA draft to the Hawks. On July 8, 2016, Horford signed a four-year, $113 million contract with the Boston Celtics. On July 12, 2016, Dwight Howard agreed to return home to Atlanta on a three-year, $70 million contract with the Hawks. The Hawks finished the season with a 43–39 record, good enough for the fifth seed. They lost in the First Round to the Washington Wizards in six games.

On June 20, 2017, Howard was traded, along with the 31st overall pick in the 2017 NBA draft, to the Charlotte Hornets in exchange for Marco Bellinelli, Miles Plumlee, and the 41st overall pick in the same draft. Two days later, the Hawks selected Wake Forest power forward John Collins with the 19th overall pick. On July 13, 2017, Paul Millsap left the Hawks by signing a multi-year deal with the Denver Nuggets.

The loss of Howard and Millsap proved insurmountable for the rebuilding Hawks as they finished with a 24–58 record in the 2017–18 season, last in the Eastern Conference, and missed the playoffs for the first time since the 2006–07 season. On April 25, 2018, the Hawks and head coach Budenholzer had mutually decided to part ways. Budenholzer later signed a deal to coach the Milwaukee Bucks.

2018–present: The Trae Young era

On May 11, 2018, Lloyd Pierce was hired by the Atlanta Hawks as head coach. On June 21, the Hawks selected Luka Dončić with the third overall pick in the 2018 NBA draft and immediately traded him to the Dallas Mavericks for a 2019 protected first-round pick and the draft rights to Trae Young. The Atlanta Hawks also selected Kevin Huerter with the 19th pick and Omari Spellman with the 30th pick of the 2018 NBA draft. It was speculated that the Hawks general manager, Travis Schlenk, was following the same plan for a rebuild that he had success with in Golden State.

In July 2018, the Hawks acquired Jeremy Lin, and traded Dennis Schröder, after he demanded to be traded. Carmelo Anthony was acquired in the trade involving Schröder, but was later waived through a buyout. During the off-season, the team signed Vince Carter and Alex Len among other players. In February 2019, Lin was bought out, and eventually signed with the Toronto Raptors.

In the 2019 NBA Draft, the Atlanta Hawks obtained DeAndre Hunter who was drafted with the 4th pick. They also used the 10th pick, that they acquired when they traded Luka Dončić for Trae Young, to acquire Cam Reddish.

On January 23, 2020, Trae Young was selected to his first All Star Game. He was voted in as a starter and was the first Hawks player to start in an All Star Game since Dikembe Mutombo in 1998. On February 4, 2020, the Hawks were involved in a four team trade in which they acquired Clint Capela and Nenê. Capela was healing from a foot injury at the time and did not play for that entire season, which was cut short due the NBA's COVID-19 protocols. Nenê was waived by the Hawks on February 6, 2020. Carter retired after the season after spending a record 22 seasons in the NBA.

Trip to the Conference Finals
For the 2020–21 season, the Atlanta Hawks made a lot of moves to upgrade their roster. They signed two proven veteran players, Bogdan Bogdanovic at the wing position and Danilo Gallinari at the power forward spot. They also signed Rajon Rondo and Kris Dunn to supply added help in the backcourt.

In March 2021, head coach Pierce was fired after the team's 14–20 start to the season and Nate McMillan was named interim head coach. After McMillan took over head coaching duties, the Hawks immediately posted an eight-game win streak, putting them firmly in playoff contention. Under coach McMillan, the Hawks went 27–11 in the regular season, and  went on to finish the regular season with a 41–31 record. This was enough for them to earn the fifth best record in the Eastern Conference and the title of Southeast division champions. In the playoffs, they defeated the fourth-seeded Knicks before upsetting the top-seeded 76ers to reach the Eastern Conference Finals, only the second time in 54 years that the franchise has advanced past the second round. They lost to Budenholzer's Bucks in six games. This deep postseason run all but assured that McMillan would have the "interim" tag removed from his title; two days after the Hawks were eliminated, the Hawks announced that McMillan had agreed in principle to a four-year deal as full-time head coach; the deal was finalized on July 7. The 2020–21 Atlanta Hawks have been compared to the 1977–78 Seattle SuperSonics, in that both teams had poor records early on, made a coaching change, surged up the rankings to get better records, and made unexpected deep playoff runs.

Season-by-season record
List of the last five seasons completed by the Hawks. For the full season-by-season history, see List of Atlanta Hawks seasons.

Note: GP = Games played, W = Wins, L = Losses, W–L% = Winning percentage

Logos and uniforms
Throughout the club's history, the team has undergone several uniform changes. The Hawks logo has shifted between variations of a full-bodied hawk holding a basketball on its claws and a silhouette of a hawk head (more commonly known as the Pac-Man logo). Red and white have been a part of the team's palette for the most part since the 1950s, but the Hawks also used various accent colors as well. Red, blue and white served as the team's color scheme during the St. Louis and early Atlanta years (1955–70), and they wore red and white uniforms for much of their tenure in St. Louis. The team moved to Atlanta in 1968 and sported baby blue and white uniforms until 1970, when they went with a blue, green and white palette. Starting in 1972, the Hawks wore red and white uniforms with yellow accents, and added black as an accent color in 1992. The color switch coincided with the arrival of the NHL's Atlanta Flames, who wore the same colors and shared the same owner as the Hawks; the now-Calgary Flames even added black a few years after the Hawks made the same tweak. From 2007 to 2015, the Hawks returned to a red, blue and white scheme, adding silver as an accent color.

On May 1, 2014, the club adopted a stylized version of the 'Pac-Man' logo that it used from 1972 to 1995. The 'Pac-Man' logo (placed in a roundel) would become the team's primary logo after the conclusion of the team's 2014–15 season. On June 24, 2015, the team unveiled its new home, road and alternate uniforms, along with its updated logos and colors. The new color scheme consisted of Torch Red, Volt Green and Georgia Granite Gray. The team also unveiled its new socks and shoes, in conjunction with the National Basketball Association (NBA)'s new contract for official game socks with Stance. Previously, official game socks were primarily either white or black, depending on a team's preference. The team wore white for home games, Georgia Granite Gray for road games, and Torch Red as an alternate uniform color.

As part of the NBA's switch to Nike, the home and road designations were replaced by "Icon", "Association" and "Statement". The Hawks carried over their uniforms that they had worn the previous two seasons. The numbers on the white "Icon" uniform were changed to red with volt green trim; the other two uniforms remained the same.

On July 21, 2020, the Hawks unveiled new uniforms with a look similar to the set they wore in the mid-1970s. They also returned to the red, black and yellow color scheme they wore from 1992 to 2007, while adding gray as an accent color.

City uniform
The Hawks also wore special edition "City" uniforms as part of its uniform deal with Nike. In the 2017–18 season, the Hawks wore black uniforms with volt green accents, featuring asymmetrical striping inspired from the team's early 1970s uniforms and futuristic fonts as a nod to the city's hip-hop music scene. In the 2018–19 season, the Hawks wore white uniforms with black and metallic gold trim as a nod to the team's 50th anniversary in Atlanta. During the 2019–20 season, the Hawks wore black uniforms with peach accents as a tribute to Atlanta's Peachtree Street. For 2020–21, the Hawks' "City" uniform paid tribute to civil rights icon Martin Luther King Jr., featuring a black base and gold accents. The 2021–22 "City" uniform featured various elements from previous uniforms, including a yellow base from the 2004–07 alternates, the full-bodied hawk logo from the 1995–99 uniform, the "Hawks" script of the 1980s uniforms, the retro "Atlanta" script from the 1970–72 uniforms, and the block numbers and striping of the 1960s uniforms. The Hawks then revisited the peachtree theme in their 2022–23 "City" uniform, once again wearing black uniforms but with white/peach gradients on the striping and numbers, and a script "Atlanta" in white.

Rivalries

Boston Celtics
The Celtics–Hawks rivalry is a rivalry in the Eastern Conference of the National Basketball Association that has lasted for over five decades, although the two teams have played each other since the 1949–50 season, when the then-Tri-Cities Blackhawks joined the NBA as part of the National Basketball League and the Basketball Association of America merger. However, the Blackhawks could not field a truly competitive team until they moved to St. Louis as the St. Louis Hawks after a four-year stopover at Milwaukee. The two teams have faced each other eleven times in the NBA playoffs, four times in the NBA Finals, with the Celtics winning ten of twelve series against the Hawks, including three out of four NBA Finals. While the Hawks have only defeated the Celtics twice out of eleven series in the NBA Playoffs, they still often managed to make their series with the Celtics memorable. The rivalry intensified in 2016 with Hawks All-Star center Al Horford spurning the team and joining the Celtics.

Orlando Magic

The Hawks and the Orlando Magic have an intense rivalry, mostly stemming from playoff competitions and the rising stardom of Dwight Howard and Josh Smith, both from the 2004 NBA draft and who were both raised in Georgia.

The two teams faced each other three times in the playoffs in 1996, 2010, and 2011 NBA playoffs. The Magic beat the Hawks in the second round of the 1996 playoffs in five games and swept their 2010 playoff matchup. The Hawks eliminated the Magic 4–2 in the first round of the 2011 playoffs.

Home arenas
 Buffalo Memorial Auditorium (1946)
 Wharton Field House (1946–1951)
 Milwaukee Arena (1951–1955)
 Kiel Auditorium and St. Louis Arena (1955–1968)
 Alexander Memorial Coliseum (1968–1972, 1997–1999)
 Omni Coliseum (1972–1997)
 Lakefront Arena (1984–1985; 12 games in New Orleans with Hawks serving as home team)
 Georgia Dome (1997–1999)
 State Farm Arena (1999–present; known as Philips Arena until 2018)

Players

Current roster

Retained draft rights
The Hawks hold the draft rights to the following unsigned draft picks who have been playing outside the NBA. A drafted player, either an international draftee or a college draftee who is not signed by the team that drafted him, is allowed to sign with any non-NBA teams. In this case, the team retains the player's draft rights in the NBA until one year after the player's contract with the non-NBA team ends. This list also includes draft rights that were acquired from trades with other teams.

Retired numbers

Notes:
 1 The Hawks retired number 59 jersey in honor of Reed who was the mayor of Atlanta from 2010 to 2018.
 The NBA retired Bill Russell's No. 6 for all its member teams on August 11, 2022.

Non-issued numbers
 40 – Jason Collier, C, 2004–2005. Never officially retired, but taken out of circulation.

Basketball Hall of Famers

Notes:
 1 He also coached the team in 1958–1960.
 2 He also coached the team in 1957.
 3 In total, Wilkens was inducted into the Hall of Fame three times – as player, as coach and as a member of the 1992 Olympic team.
 4 In total, Bellamy was inducted into the Hall of Fame twice – as player and as a member of the 1960 Olympic team.
 5 He also coached the team in 1964–1972.
 6 He also played for the team in 1953–1954.
 7 He also played for the team in 1954–1956 and 1956–1957.

FIBA Hall of Famers

Franchise leaders
Bold denotes still active with team.

Italic denotes still active but not with team.

Points scored (regular season) (as of the end of the 2021–22 season)

 1. Dominique Wilkins (23,292)
 2. Bob Pettit (20,880)
 3. Lou Hudson (16,049)
 4. Cliff Hagan (13,447)
 5. John Drew (12,621)
 6. Joe Johnson (10,606)
 7. Kevin Willis (10,582)
 8. Josh Smith (10,371)
 9. Eddie Johnson (9,631)
 10. Zelmo Beaty (8,727)
 11. Bill Bridges (8,685)
 12. Lenny Wilkens (8,591)
 13. Al Horford (8,288)
 14. Mookie Blaylock (7,743)
 15. Dan Roundfield (7,644)
 16. Doc Rivers (7,357)
 17. Pete Maravich (7,325)
 18. Trae Young (7,076)
 19. Jason Terry (6,534)
 20. Jeff Teague (6,484)
 21. Steve Smith (6,291)
 22. Joe Caldwell (6,072)
 23. Tree Rollins (5,666)
 24. Marvin Williams (5,616)
 25. Stacey Augmon (5,356)
 26. Walt Bellamy (5,289)
 27. Paul Millsap (5,177)
 28. John Collins (4,837)
 29. Clyde Lovellette (4,733)
 30. Alan Henderson (4,575)
 31. Dennis Schröder (4,545)
 32. Steve Hawes (4,498)
 33. Shareef Abdur-Rahim (4,309)
 34. Richie Guerin (4,284)
 35. Cliff Levingston (4,205)
 36. Chuck Share (4,119)
 37. Dikembe Mutombo (4,095)
 38. Moses Malone (4,034)
 39. Zaza Pachulia (4,032)
 40. John Battle (3,882)
 41. Spud Webb (3,702)
 42. Kent Bazemore (3,678)
 43. Kyle Korver (3,615)
 44. Tom McMillen (3,523)
 45. Randy Wittman (3,522)
 46. Walt Hazzard (3,500)
 47. Herm Gilliam (3,496)
 48. Jon Koncak (3,317)
 49. John Brown (3,222)
 50. Josh Childress (3,162)

Other statistics (regular season) (as of the end of the 2021–22 season)

Coaches

Awards and accomplishments

Individual awards

NBA MVP
Bob Pettit – 1956, 1959 (St. Louis Hawks)

NBA Defensive Player of the Year
Dikembe Mutombo – 1997, 1998

NBA Rookie of the Year
Bob Pettit – 1955 (St. Louis Hawks)

NBA Most Improved Player of the Year
Alan Henderson – 1998

NBA Sixth Man of the Year
Jamal Crawford – 2010

NBA Coach of the Year
Harry Gallatin – 1963 (St. Louis Hawks)
Richie Guerin – 1968 (St. Louis Hawks)
Hubie Brown – 1978
Mike Fratello – 1986
Lenny Wilkens – 1994
Mike Budenholzer – 2015

NBA Executive of the Year
Stan Kasten – 1986, 1987

NBA Sportsmanship Award
Kyle Korver – 2015
Vince Carter – 2020

J. Walter Kennedy Citizenship Award
Doc Rivers – 1990
Joe O'Toole – 1995
Steve Smith – 1998

All-NBA First Team
Bob Pettit – 1955–1964 (Milwaukee/St. Louis Hawks)
Dominique Wilkins – 1986

All-NBA Second Team
Frank Brian – 1951 (Tri-Cities Blackhawks)
Slater Martin – 1957, 1958, 1959 (St. Louis Hawks)
Cliff Hagan – 1958, 1959 (St. Louis Hawks)
Bob Pettit – 1965 (St. Louis Hawks)
Lou Hudson – 1970
Pete Maravich – 1973
Dan Roundfield – 1980
Dominique Wilkins – 1987, 1988, 1991, 1993
Dikembe Mutombo – 2001

All-NBA Third Team
Dominique Wilkins – 1989
Kevin Willis – 1992
Dikembe Mutombo – 1998
Joe Johnson – 2010
Al Horford – 2011
Trae Young – 2022

NBA All-Defensive First Team
Dan Roundfield – 1980, 1982, 1983
Wayne Rollins – 1984
Mookie Blaylock – 1994, 1995
Dikembe Mutombo – 1997, 1998

NBA All-Defensive Second Team
Bill Bridges – 1969, 1970
Joe Caldwell – 1970
"Fast Eddie" Johnson – 1979, 1980
Dan Roundfield – 1981, 1984
Wayne Rollins – 1983
Mookie Blaylock – 1996–1999
Dikembe Mutombo – 1999
Josh Smith – 2010
Paul Millsap – 2016

NBA All-Rookie First Team
Zelmo Beaty – 1963 (St. Louis Hawks)
Lou Hudson – 1967 (St. Louis Hawks)
Pete Maravich – 1971
John Brown – 1974
John Drew – 1975
Dominique Wilkins – 1983
Stacey Augmon – 1992
Al Horford – 2008
Trae Young – 2019

NBA All-Rookie Second Team
Jason Terry – 2000
Josh Childress – 2005
Josh Smith – 2005
Marvin Williams – 2006
John Collins – 2018
Kevin Huerter – 2019

NBA All-Star Weekend

NBA All-Star Game selections
Frankie Brian – 1951
Dike Eddleman – 1951, 1952
Mel Hutchins – 1953
Don Sunderlage – 1954
Frank Selvy – 1955
Bob Pettit – 1955–1965
Bob Harrison – 1956
Ed Macauley – 1957
Slater Martin – 1957-1959
Cliff Hagan – 1958–1962
Clyde Lovellette – 1960, 1961
Lenny Wilkens – 1963–1965, 1967, 1968
Zelmo Beaty – 1966, 1968
Bill Bridges – 1967, 1968, 1970
Joe Caldwell – 1969, 1970
Lou Hudson – 1969–1974
Pete Maravich – 1973, 1974
John Drew – 1976, 1980
Eddie Johnson – 1980, 1981
Dan Roundfield – 1980–1982
Dominique Wilkins – 1986–1994
Doc Rivers – 1988
Moses Malone – 1989
Kevin Willis – 1992
Mookie Blaylock – 1994
Christian Laettner – 1997
Dikembe Mutombo – 1997, 1998, 2000, 2001
Steve Smith – 1998
Shareef Abdur-Rahim – 2002
Joe Johnson – 2007–2012
Al Horford – 2010, 2011, 2015, 2016
Paul Millsap – 2014–2017
Kyle Korver – 2015
Jeff Teague – 2015
Trae Young – 2020, 2022

NBA All-Star Game head coaches
Alex Hannum – 1958
Ed Macauley – 1959, 1960
Paul Seymour – 1961
Richie Guerin – 1969, 1970
Mike Fratello – 1988
Lenny Wilkens – 1994
Mike Budenholzer – 2015

NBA All-Star Game MVP
Bob Pettit – 1956, 1958, 1959, 1962

References

External links

 

 
Events in Atlanta
Basketball teams established in 1946
National Basketball Association teams
1946 establishments in Illinois
Relocated National Basketball Association teams
Former Time Warner subsidiaries